Loewia is a genus of flies in the family Tachinidae.

Species
L. adjuncta Herting, 1971
L. alpestris (Villeneuve, 1920)
L. brevifrons (Rondani, 1856)
L. cretica Ziegler, 1996
L. foeda (Meigen, 1824)
L. nudigena Mesnil, 1973
L. papei Cerretti, Giudice & O’Hara, 2014
L. phaeoptera (Meigen, 1824)
L. piligena Mesnil, 1973
L. rondanii (Villeneuve, 1919)
L. setibarba Egger, 1856
L. submetallica (Macquart, 1855)

References

Tachininae
Articles containing video clips
Tachinidae genera
Taxa named by Johann Egger